"Parti pour zouker" is the name of a 2006 song recorded by the French artist Lorie. It was the third single from her fourth studio album, Rester la même, on which it is the eighth track. It was released on 26 May 2006 and features Dadoumike, a rapper who performs the background vocals. This song, which has zouk influences, was a summer hit in France, where it reached the top five, and also had success in Belgium (Wallonia).

Chart information
The song was performed on Lorie's 2006 tour and was thus available on her live album Live tour 2006 (fourth track, CD 2). It was also included on the French compilations La Compil du lapinou, Hits 2 en 1 2006, vol. 3 and Crazy Kids 3.

The music video was shot on a beach of Deshaies, Guadeloupe, and was directed by Karim Ouaret.

In France, the single gave Lorie a new top five hit, which she had not had since "Week End" in 2003. It remained in the top ten for three weeks, in the top 50 for 16 weeks, and in the top 100 for 19 weeks. It was certified Silver and was the 45th best-selling single of the year.

In Belgium, the single appeared for 15 weeks on the Ultratop 40. It started at #32 on 10 June and gained a few places almost every week, until reaching #12 in its eighth week. Then it regularly dropped on the chart. It was eventually ranked at #63 on the Annual Chart.

Track listings
 CD single
 "Parti pour zouker" (radio edit) — 3:19
 "Parti pour zouker" (club mix) — 5:52
 "Parti pour zouker" (instrumental) — 3:17

 Digital download
 "Parti pour zouker" (radio edit) — 3:19
 "Parti pour zouker" (club mix) — 5:52
 "Parti pour zouker" (instrumental) — 3:17
 "Parti pour zouker" (video) — 3:48

Charts and sales

Peak positions

Year-end charts

Certifications

References

2005 songs
2006 singles
Lorie (singer) songs